Walter Hartley  (born 1879) was an organist and composer based in England.

Life

He was born in Leeds in 1879. He was educated at Durham University.

He married Alice Lillian Wilson, the daughter of Robert Kirby Wilson, on 31 July 1902 in the Brunswick Chapel, Leeds. They had two children:
George Wilson Hartley (b. 1903)
Constance Hartley (b. 1905)

Appointments

Organist of Providence Chapel, Leeds 1895 - 1897
Organist of St. Peter's Church, Leeds, 1897 - 1900
Organist of Queen Street Congregational Church 1900 - 1909
Organist of Roscoe Wesleyan Church 1909 - 1914
Organist of St. Mark's Church, Leeds 1914 - 1921
Organist of Selby Abbey 1922 - 1962

Compositions

He composed:
Magnificat and Nunc Dimittis in B flat
Magnificat and Nunc Dimittis in G
Benedicite in F

References

1879 births
English organists
British male organists
English composers
Year of death missing